Andrey Sherakow (born 10 November 1982) is a Belarusian former professional footballer.

Honours
Gomel
Belarusian Super Cup winner: 2012

External links

1982 births
Living people
Belarusian footballers
Association football forwards
Belarusian expatriate footballers
Expatriate footballers in Azerbaijan
FC Darida Minsk Raion players
FC Energetik-BGU Minsk players
FC Dynamo Brest players
FC Torpedo-BelAZ Zhodino players
Simurq PIK players
FC Granit Mikashevichi players
FC Minsk players
FC Gomel players
FC Slavia Mozyr players
FC Luch Minsk (2012) players
FC Belshina Bobruisk players
FC Uzda players
Sportspeople from Brest, Belarus